LBOZ is a coefficient used in spectrophotometry to estimate selectivity (amount of overlapping of spectra) in a quantitative manner. It is named after its creators: Lorber, Bergmann, von Oepen, and Zinn.

Definition 

Let  be a matrix of the spectra (absorbances), where the k rows correspond to the components in mixture and n columns correspond to the sequence of wavelengths. The LBOZ criterion for kth component is calculated from the following formula:

where  means a pseudoinverse of the matrix and  means an euclidean length of a vector.

Properties 
The image above show synthetic gaussian spectra. The LBOZ criteria are: 0.561 for black compound, 0.402 for red compound, 0.899 for green and 0.549 for blue. LBOZ always lie in range <0,1> and has strong mathematical sense - it presents the amount of spectral signal which is not overlapped by the others. In this case, the highest uncertainty is expected during determination of red compound - theoretically 2.38 times greater than during determination of its compound alone.

References 

 
 
 

Absorption spectroscopy